The Powder River Pass is also the name of a football play, taking place between Arkansas and Ole Miss in 1954.

Powder River Pass (el. 9666 ft.) is a mountain pass in the Bighorn Mountains in Wyoming traversed by U.S. Highway 16.  Also known as Muddy Pass, it is the highest point on Highway 16. It is between the towns of Buffalo and Ten Sleep.

References

Landforms of Johnson County, Wyoming
Mountain passes of Wyoming
Transportation in Johnson County, Wyoming